Allocasuarina muelleriana, commonly known as the slaty sheoak, is a small tree of the genus Allocasuarina native to South Australia and Victoria.

References

External links
  Occurrence data for Allocasuarina muelleriana from The Australasian Virtual Herbarium

muelleriana
Flora of South Australia
Flora of Victoria (Australia)
Fagales of Australia
Dioecious plants